The 2010–11 TFF First League, also known as Bank Asya First League due to sponsoring reasons (in Turkish: Bank Asya 1. Lig), is the tenth season since the league established in 2001 and 48th season of the second-level football league of Turkey since its establishment in 1963–64.

Normal season started on 20 August 2010, Friday by Adanaspor-Mersin İdmanyurdu match and ended on 15 May 2011. Play-off games were played 23–29 May 2011.

League was started with 17 teams. Ankaraspor, which was directly relegated from 2009–10 Süper Lig, was dismissed from the federation because the club appealed to a court for that decision. Top two teams will directly be promoted to the 2011–12 Süper Lig. The third team to be promoted was determined via play-off games among 3rd through 6th teams of the league. Bottom two teams were relegated to 2011–12 TFF Second League.

Teams
Ankaraspor was relegated from the Süper Lig by TFF in October 2009 for anti-competitive behaviour. Denizlispor was relegated from Süper Lig after the 31st week games of Süper Lig 2009–10. After the 33rd week of Süper Lig 2009–10, Diyarbakırspor were also relegated.

Akhisar Belediyespor promoted from TFF Second League after a 2–0 win over Göztepe on May 2, 2010. Güngören Belediyespor returned to First League, were relegated in 2008–2009 season, their first attempt after a 1–0 win against Tokatspor at away match on May 2, 2010. The last promoting team was Tavşanlı Linyitspor, made second consecutive promotion, after a 2–1 win against Eyüpspor at extra play-off final in Antalya on May 30, 2010.

On 4 August 2010, the TFF dismissed Ankaraspor from the league because the club has gone before the court for the previous year's relegation matters, an out-of-system way that the federation that does not approve against its final decisions. The TFF have decided that the league will be played with 17 teams for 2010–11; teams who were originally scheduled to play against Ankaraspor will be given a bye in the corresponding round.

Team summaries

Managerial changes
Before the start of the season

After the start of the season

League table

Positions by round

Results

Promotion playoffs
The teams ranked third through sixth will compete in the promotion playoffs for the 2011–12 Süper Lig. The 3rd team and 6th team will play two matches in their own grounds. Likewise 4th and 5th teams will play two mathes elimination round. This round is named as semi-finals. Winner teams will play one final match at a neutral venue. Winner of the final will be third team to promote to Süper Lig 2011–2012.

Semi-finals 3-6

Semi-finals 4–5

Final

Top goalscorers

References

See also
 2010–11 Türkiye Kupası
 2010–11 Süper Lig
 2010–11 TFF Second League
 2010–11 TFF Third League

TFF First League seasons
Turkey
1